Pene Erenio (born 20 January 1981) in Fiji is a footballer who plays as a midfielder. He currently plays for Savusavu in the Senior League (Second Tier) and the Fiji national football team.

References

1981 births
Living people
Fijian people of Rotuman descent
Fijian footballers
Fiji international footballers
Association football midfielders
Navua F.C. players
Rewa F.C. players
I-Taukei Fijian people
People from Navua
2004 OFC Nations Cup players
2008 OFC Nations Cup players